Train Simulator (トレインシミュレーター, Torein Shimyurētā or abbreviated "TS") is a Japanese train simulation game series produced by Ongakukan. The game is significant as it was one of the earliest of its kind since the series started in 1995. No titles were released outside of Asia until the 2022 title JR East Train Simulator.

The original Train Simulator series (1995–2000) was designed from technology which was previously used to develop the Ongakukan product "Touch the Music by Casiopea", which synchronized video with audio. This particular game was based on music from the jazz fusion band Casiopea, whose keyboard player at the time, Minoru Mukaiya, was, and is, also the CEO of Ongakukan. With Train Simulator Ongakukan filmed video from the cab of a train on the desired railway and recorded sounds from that train. Later when the simulation had been completed and was running on a PC, the video would be displayed in a silver metallic box and the sounds would be played according to what was happening at that particular moment in the simulation. The video for the original Train Simulator series of games was 308×156 pixels at 30 frames per second using Intel Indeo 2 video compression and AVI file container.

Each game contains Japanese lines and trains, with the exception of four episodes located overseas, in Germany, France, Taiwan, and the United States of America. Video shot from the cab of the train synchronized with the computer is used as a basis for simulation. Ongakukan have endeavoured to produce true to life simulation with much technical details, and since 2005, Ongakukan has started producing professional simulators for driver training.

Versions
Six distinct series of the game have been produced through a decade:

Train Simulator (1995–2000)
The original series, starting in 1995, these titles were all released on Windows and Macintosh systems. 
1995.08.19: Train Simulator JR East Chūō Line 201 Series
(Nakano - Toyoda)
1995.09.21: Train Simulator JR East Tōkaidō Main Line 211 Series
(Kamonomiya - Totsuka)
1995.05.21: Train Simulator JR East Tōhoku Main Line 211 Series
(Toro - Mamada)
1996.07.19: Train Simulator Odakyu Railway Odawara Line 5000 Series
(Chitose Funabashi - Sagami Ono)
1996.11.21: Train Simulator Sagami Railway Main Line 9000 Series
(Yokohama - Ebina)
1997.03.21: Train Simulator German Railway Rhine River Left Bank Line
(Bingen - Koblenz)
1997.05.16: Train Simulator Nanbu Jukan Railway (Also released as a Collector's Edition)
(Shichinohe - Noheji)
1997.06.18: Train Simulator Keihin Kyuko Railway Main Line, Kurihama Line
(Shinagawa - Misakiguchi)
1997.09.19: Train Simulator JR Shikoku 1
(Takamatsu - Kotohira, Takamatsu - Kojima)
1997.12.17: Train Simulator Seibu Railway Shinjuku Line
(Seibu Shinjuku - Honkawagoe)
1998.04.17: Train Simulator Nagoya Railway
Nagoya Main Line, Inuyama Line (Kanayama - Shin-Unuma), Hiromi Line (Inuyama - Shin-Kani), HSST-100 Test Track  (Ōe - Higashi-Nagoyakō)
1998.07.17: Train Simulator Hanshin Electric Railway
(Umeda - Kosoku Kobe)
1998.09.18: Train Simulator JR Hokkaidō (1)
(Yoichi - Sapporo)
1998.12.18: Train Simulator JR East Yamanote Line (also released as Train Simulator DVD 1999.12.17)
(Osaki - Osaki, anti-clockwise)
1999.07.07: Train Simulator South France (also released as Train Simulator DVD)
(Cannes - Nice - Monte Carlo - Menton)
1999.09.17: Train Simulator Kintetsu Minami Osaka Line & Yoshino Line
(Abenobashi - Yoshino)
2000.03.17: Train Simulator JR East Keihin-Tohoku Line
(Kamata - Omiya)

Train Simulator Plus (2000–2001)
The Train Simulator Plus series was designed for the Windows system and its releases were limited to Japan. The first episodes were published by Pony Canyon while the last one was published by Ongakukan.
2000.07: Train Simulator PLUS: Keihan Electric Railway
(Yodoyabashi-Demachi Yanage)
2000.10: Train Simulator PLUS: East JR Chūō Line 2
(Tokyo-Otsuki)
2001.02: Train Simulator PLUS: Odakyu Electric Railway Odawara Line 2
(Shinjuku - Odawara)
2001.12: Train Simulator PLUS: Kyoto Municipal Subway Karasuma Line & Kintetsu Kyoto Line
(Kokusai Kaikan, Takeda, Kintetsu Nara)

Train Simulator Real (2001–2002)
Released by SCE on PlayStation 2 system.
2001.10: Train Simulator Real: THE Yamanote Line
(Osaki - Osaki, clockwise)
2002.10: Train Simulator Real: THE Keihin Electric Express Railway
(Misakiguchi-Shinagawa, Haneda Airport-Keikyu Kamata, Shinagawa)

Train Simulator (2003–2005)
Released on PlayStation 2 system.
2003.10: Train Simulator: Midosuji Line
Osaka Subway (Nakamozu - Senri Chūō)
2003.12: Train Simulator ＋ Densha de GO!: Tokyu Line
(Sakuragicho - Shibuya, Shibuya - Chūō Rinkan, Oimachi - Futako Tamagawa)
2005.08: Train Simulator: Keisei, Toei Asakusa, Keikyu Lines
(Haneda Airport or Ueno - Aoto - Narita Airport)
2005.10: Train Simulator: Kyūshū Shinkansen
JR Kyūshū (Shin-Yatsushiro - Kagoshima Chūō, Kumamoto - Minamata, Kumamoto - Shin-Yatsushiro)

Mobile Train Simulator (2005–2006)
Released on PlayStation Portable system from 2005 to 2006 and available in Japan and Asia (Hong Kong, Taiwan, Singapore). The first episode was co-developed with rival series Densha de Go! producer Taito. (Taito by themselves have also released 4 editions of Densha de Go for PSP).
2005.02: Mobile Train Simulator ＋ Densha de GO!: Tokyo Kyuko Line
(Sakuragicho-Shibuya, Shibuya-Chūō Rinkan, Oimachi-Futako Tamagawa)
2006.02: Mobile Train Simulator: Keisei, Toei Asakusa, Keikyu lines
(Haneda Airport-Aoto, Ueno-Narita Airport)

Railfan (2006–2007)
The latest series was renamed Railfan, it started in 2006 and was designed for the PlayStation 3 system. The first episode introduced in December 2006 was developed by Ongakukan and published by Ongakukan in Japan, by Sony Computer Entertainment in Asia (Hong Kong, Taiwan and Singapore) and by Cyberfront Korea in South Korea. 
 2006.12: Railfan: Chicago Transit Authority Brown Line
Chuo Main Line (Mitaka-Tokyo), Keihan Main Line (Demachiyanagi-Yodoyabashi), Chicago Brown Line (Fullerton, Loop, Fullerton)
 2007 Railfan Taiwan Koutetsu released in Japan late 2007 for PlayStation 3, published by Ongakukan. The game simulates the early-2007 high speed rail line in Taiwan, from Taipei to Zuoying. The game provides a simulation of a train moving at 300 km/hour and details of 300 locations.

JR East Train Simulator (2022)
Released in November 2022, JR East Train Simulator was the first title in the series to be released in the West. The base game features short segments of the Tōkaidō, Chūō, and Ōito lines, with DLC available to extend these lines to their full length.

Controllers
A number of external controllers with realistic controls have been manufactured for use with the games:
Train Mascon (uses serial port to connect to PC or Macintosh)
Master Controller II for Trainsimulator (USB)
Multi Train Controller (PlayStation 2)
RailDriver Desktop Train Cab Controller (USB to PC)

References

External links
 

1995 video games
Classic Mac OS games
Windows games
PlayStation 2 games
PlayStation 3 games
Train simulation video games
Video games developed in Japan
Video game franchises
Video game franchises introduced in 1995